Frederick James Crooke (21 April 1844 – 6 August 1923) was an English cricketer active from 1865 to 1875 who played for Lancashire and Gloucestershire. He was born in Liverpool and died in Southsea. He appeared in 21 first-class matches as a righthanded batsman who bowled right arm fast roundarm. He scored 573 runs with a highest score of 56 not out and took no wickets.

References

1844 births
1923 deaths
English cricketers
Gloucestershire cricketers
Lancashire cricketers
Marylebone Cricket Club cricketers
Gentlemen of England cricketers